Kevin Niclas Mensah (born 10 May 1991) is a Danish professional footballer who plays as a full-back for the Danish Superliga club Brøndby IF.

Starting his career in Viborg FF, Mensah later moved to Esbjerg fB before joining Brøndby in 2017. Originally a forward, Mensah transitioned into a utility player while at Brøndby, starting out as a striker but later becoming a full-back due to a shortage of available players on the position. Under head coach Niels Frederiksen, Mensah has been utilised at both right and left wing-back, where his agility and attacking mentality have come to their right. In July 2019, he was appointed new vice-captain of the club.

Mensah has made appearances for various national youth teams of Denmark while at Viborg, gaining 26 total caps in which he scored four goals.

Career

Viborg FF
Mensah played his first years of youth football for Søndermarkens IK in his hometown Viborg. When he was 15 he signed with Viborg FF after being part of talent project FK Viborg.

In 2008, he trained regularly with the Danish Superliga squad for Viborg FF, and on 2 May 2009, at 17 years of age, he scored his first goal for the team, in a 2–0 win over Thisted FC in the Danish second tier. The day before his 18th birthday, he was permanently promoted to the first team. He had previously been on trial at Premier League clubs Arsenal and Newcastle United for several laps despite his young age.

On 30 June 2011, his contract with Viborg FF expired, and a few days before he went on a trial with FC Nordsjælland without this materialising in a contract offer. Therefore, Mensah returned to Viborg FF to keep his physical shape straight together with former teammates. When he still had not received any offers from clubs at the beginning of the next season, he started playing as an amateur for Viborg FF. In August 2011, the club offered him a new professional contract, which meant that he signed a two-year deal with the Viborg FF in October 2011.

After Viborg FF reached promotion to the Superliga in 2013, Mensah signed another two-year contract extension keeping him in his hometown club until 30 June 2015.

Esbjerg fB
On 2 February 2015 Esbjerg fB signed Mensah. Originally, he would transfer to Esbjerg in the summer of 2015. However, Viborg and Esbjerg reached an agreement on a transfer on the last day of the January transfer window, as Viborg had found a replacement for him in the meantime.

On 2 March 2015, Mensah made his debut for Esbjerg in a Danish Superliga match against AaB, coming in as a 72nd-minute substitute for Mohammed Fellah.

Brøndby IF
On 23 January 2017, Brøndby IF confirmed that they had reached an agreement with Esbjerg for the transfer of Mensah.

In the last match of the 2017–18 season, Mensah tore his anterior cruciate ligament, ruling him out for seven to nine months following surgery on his knee.

After making his return in February 2019, and following the departure of right back Johan Larsson to EA Guingamp, Brøndby manager Alexander Zorniger opted to move Mensah to right back to accommodate the shortage of backs in the squad, which meant that he would serve as the backup to Jens Martin Gammelby. Due to Anthony Jung's poor form at left back, Mensah was utilised in this position too in the 2018–19 season with great success.

In July 2019, he was appointed new vice-captain of the club.

On 6 March 2022, Mensah tore his anterior cruciate ligament once again in a league match against Silkeborg, and was expected to be sidelined for a year.

Playing style
Mensah plays the ball with both his right-foot and left-foot, and has been described as a technical marvel, an elegant offensive player with a wonderful technique that makes him a crowd favorite in addition of a footspeed that makes him uncomfortable to handle for any defender.

Family
His brother Jeff Mensah also plays professional football. He holds both a Ghanaian passport and a Danish passport.

Honours
Viborg
Danish 1st Division: 2012–13, 2014–15

Brøndby
Danish Superliga: 2020–21
Danish Cup: 2017–18; runner-up: 2018–19

References

External links

1991 births
Living people
Danish men's footballers
Denmark youth international footballers
Danish people of Ghanaian descent
Association football midfielders
Danish Superliga players
Viborg FF players
Esbjerg fB players
Brøndby IF players
People from Viborg Municipality
Sportspeople from the Central Denmark Region